Catherine de Foix (c. 1455 – died before 1494) was a French noblewoman.

She was a daughter of Gaston IV, Count of Foix, and Eleanor of Navarre, and was a granddaughter of John II of Aragon and Blanche I of Navarre.

Catherine married Gaston de Foix, Count of Candale. They had:
Gaston de Foix, 3rd Count of Candale.
Jean de Foix, Archbishop of Bordeaux.
Pierre de Foix, died without issue.
Anne de Foix (1484-1506), married King Vladislaus II of Bohemia and Hungary.

References

Sources

1450s births
Year of birth uncertain
Year of death unknown
15th-century deaths
15th-century French people
15th-century French women
House of Foix
Navarrese infantas